KQHW-LD was a low power digital television station serving the District of Puna, south of Hilo, Hawai`i.

KQHW-LD's transmission facility was located in its community of license of Mountain View, Hawaii.

The station served a 172 square mile area, and covered an estimated population of 31,106. Reception was also available in the Pahoa, Hawaii area  using a rooftop antenna. The station operated much like a channel 6 radio station, with music playing instead of the more usual video programming.

History
KQHW's original construction permit was applied for on October 3, 2010 and was granted a construction permit on January 30, 2012.

The station's license was cancelled by the Federal Communications Commission on January 11, 2022.

Digital television

References

External links

QHW-LD
Television channels and stations established in 2013
Defunct television stations in the United States
Television channels and stations disestablished in 2021
2021 disestablishments in Hawaii
QHW-LD